Roberto Abrussezze (born 29 March 1948) is a Brazilian manager and former professional footballer who played as a forward.

References

External links

http://www.elsalvador.com/noticias/EDICIONESANTERIORES/2000/OCTUBRE/octubre21/DEPORTES/depor8.html
http://www.clubdeportivofas.com/Plantillas/Fichas/DT_Roberto_Abrusseze.html
http://www.ceroacero.es/treinador.php?id=6925
https://www.eluniverso.com/2009/09/14/1/1372/roberto-abrussezze-no-hacia-banar-jugadores.html

1948 births
Living people
Footballers from Rio de Janeiro (city)
Brazilian footballers
Association football forwards
F.C. Motagua players
C.S. Cartaginés players
Liga Nacional de Fútbol Profesional de Honduras players
Expatriate footballers in Spain
Expatriate footballers in Honduras
Expatriate footballers in Costa Rica
Brazilian football managers
Expatriate football managers in El Salvador
F.C. Motagua managers
C.D. El Nacional managers
C.D. FAS managers
Operário Ferroviário Esporte Clube managers
Deportivo Municipal managers